Nancy Kahn Stanton is a professor emeritus of mathematics at University of Notre Dame. She is known for her research in  complex analysis, partial differential equations, and differential geometry.

Career
Stanton received her Ph.D. from Massachusetts Institute of Technology in 1973 under Isadore Singer. Stanton now works at University of Notre Dame.

Awards and honors

In 1981, Stanton became a Sloan Research Fellow.

In 2012, Stanton became a fellow of the American Mathematical Society.

Selected publications
 Stanton, Nancy K. Infinitesimal CR automorphisms of real hypersurfaces. Amer. J. Math. 118 (1996), no. 1, 209–233.
 Beals, Richard; Greiner, Peter C.; Stanton, Nancy K. The heat equation on a CR manifold. J. Differential Geom. 20 (1984), no. 2, 343–387.
 Stanton, Nancy K. Infinitesimal CR automorphisms of rigid hypersurfaces. Amer. J. Math. 117 (1995), no. 1, 141–167. 
 Pinsky, Mark A.; Stanton, Nancy K.; Trapa, Peter E. Fourier series of radial functions in several variables. J. Funct. Anal. 116 (1993), no. 1, 111–132.

References

Living people
American women mathematicians
20th-century American mathematicians
21st-century American mathematicians
Fellows of the American Mathematical Society
20th-century women mathematicians
21st-century women mathematicians
Year of birth missing (living people)
20th-century American women
21st-century American women